Havvannet (Norwegian) or  (Northern Sami) is a lake in Måsøy Municipality in Troms og Finnmark county, Norway.

See also
List of lakes in Norway

References

Måsøy
Lakes of Troms og Finnmark